, based in Tokyo and Osaka, Japan, is a specialty contractor for the design, engineering, fabrication and installation of tensile membrane structures.

History
Founded in 1922 as Nohmura Tent Company, the company faced setbacks during World War II, but nonetheless was reconstructed in August 1946 as Nohmura Sewing Factory, eventually renaming its business to Taiyo Kogyo Corporation. Its headquarters are located in Tokyo and Osaka, Japan. Currently, Taiyo Kogyo has 37 subsidiaries across 13 countries.

Product lines
Tensile membrane structures
ETFE structures
Textile interiors
Textile façades
Tent warehouses
Civil engineering projects
Taiyo Multipurpose Truss Space frame structures
Logistic systems
Fresh conditioning transportation system
Transparent Photovoltaic glass

Domestic subsidiaries
Taiyo Tent Hokuriku Co.,Ltd.
Fukui Taiyo Co.,Ltd.
Taiyo Tent Kantoh co.,Ltd.
Meihan Tekko Co.,Ltd.
Transport & Distribution Service, Inc.
Higashi-Nihon Container Service Co.,Ltd.
Naka-Nihon Container Service Co.,Ltd.
Osaka Container Service Co.,Ltd.
Mizushima Container Service Co.,Ltd.
Kitakyushu Container Service Co.,Ltd.
Taiyokogyo Geo Techno Service Co.,Ltd.
Taiyo Enesys, Inc.
Kansai Taiyo Tent co.,Ltd.
Depotrent Inc.
Dououkentetsu corporation
En-T Design Co., Ltd
TSP Taiyo Inc.
Actio Corporation
FESTAL-KANSAI, Co., Ltd.
FESTAL-KANTO, Co., Ltd.
Rentool Taiyo Co., Ltd.

Overseas subsidiaries

Birdair

Birdair was founded in 1957 in Buffalo, New York by Walter Bird.

In 1992 the company became a division of Taiyo Kogyo Corporation.

In addition to its high-profile structures it deploys collapsible umbrellas for restaurants and non-collapsible umbrellas for bigger projects through its Birdair Architectural Umbrellas subdivision.

Its headquarters is in the Buffalo suburb of Amherst, New York.

Taiyo Membrane Corporation

Taiyo Membrane Corporation is a supplier of tensile membrane structures within Australia and the Oceania region. Trading as MakMax Australia, the head office is located in the largely industrial area of Eagle Farm, north-east of the Brisbane CBD in Queensland Australia.

MakMax Australia was formed in 1984 in Australia under the name Shade Structures Pacific and originally raised to prominence through its innovative shade structures for the 1988 World Expo in Brisbane. The company joined the Taiyo Kogyo Group after it joined with USA Company Birdair Inc in 2001 and became Shade Structures Birdair.

In 2003 Shade Structures Birdair was transferred to Taiyo Kogyo Corporation and the company was changed to Taiyo Membrane Corporation. In 2007 Taiyo Membrane Corporation changed their Australian trading name to MakMax Australia whilst still trading under Taiyo Membrane Corporation internationally.

Notable projects

Sports facilities
Karaiskákis Stadium, Athens, Greece
Flemington Racecourse, Melbourne, Victoria, Australia
Melbourne Sports and Aquatic Centre, Melbourne, Victoria, Australia
Healesville Sanctuary, Victoria, Australia
Queensland Tennis Centre, Brisbane, Queensland, Australia
Warner Bros. Movie World, Gold Coast, Queensland, Australia
The Gabba, Brisbane, Queensland, Australia
Anna Mears Velodrome, Membrane Roof and Facade, Brisbane, Australia
Optus Stadium Halo Roof, Perth, Australia
Memorial Drive Tennis Centre, Adelaide, South Australia
Hubert H. Humphrey Metrodome, Minneapolis, Minnesota, United States
BC Place Stadium, Vancouver, British Columbia, Canada
Tokyo Dome, Tokyo, Japan
Donald N. Dedmon Center, Radford, Virginia, United States
Red Bull Arena, Harrison, New Jersey, United States
Cape Town Stadium, Cape Town, South Africa
Durban Stadium, Durban, South Africa
Nelson Mandela Bay Stadium, Port Elizabeth, South Africa
Cowboys Stadium, Arlington, Texas, United States
Tropicana Field, St. Petersburg, Florida, United States
Stadio Olimpico, Rome, Italy
Ravenna Sports Palace, Ravenna, Italy
Georgia Dome, Atlanta, Georgia, United States
Taoyuan County Stadium, Taipei, Taiwan
Hong Kou Stadium, Shanghai, China
Cohen Stadium, El Paso, Texas, United States
Kuwait National Stadium, Safat, Kuwait
The Home Depot Center, Carson, California, United States
HSBC Arena, Buffalo, New York, United States
Shanghai Stadium, Shanghai, China
Baptist Sports Park, Nashville, Tennessee, United States
Wuhan Stadium, Wuhan, China
HSH Nordbank Arena, Hamburg, Germany
Komatsu Dome, Komatsu, Japan
Misawa Ice Arena, Misawa, Japan
Paul Brown Stadium, Cincinnati, Ohio, United States
Shanghai International Circuit, Shanghai, China
Shin Amagi Dome, Amagi, Japan
Arena AufSchalke, Gelsenkirchen, Germany
Chase Field, Phoenix, Arizona, United States
Shanghai Sports Facility, Shanghai, China
Brown University, Providence, Rhode Island, United States
Reliant Stadium, Houston, Texas, United States
Incheon Munhak Stadium, Incheon, South Korea
University of Phoenix Stadium, Glendale, Arizona, United States
The O2 (Millennium Dome), London, England, UK

Transportation
Denver International Airport, Denver, Colorado, United States
Amgen Helix Pedestrian Bridge, Seattle, Washington, United States
Rapid Central Station, Grand Rapids, Michigan, United States
Palm Springs Airport - S. Bono Terminal, Palm Springs, California, United States
San Jose De Los Cabos International Airport, Las Cabos, Mexico

Commercial
San Diego Convention Center, San Diego, California, United States
Broward County Convention Center, Fort Lauderdale, Florida, United States
The Sony Center, Berlin, Germany
David L. Lawrence Convention Center, Pittsburgh, Pennsylvania, United States

Institutional
University of La Verne Sports Science, La Verne, California, United States
Strong National Museum of Play, Rochester, New York, United States
Wildwoods Convention Center, Wildwood, New Jersey, United States

References

External links
Taiyo Kogyo Group website
Birdair, Inc. website
Shanghai Taiyo Kogyo Co., Ltd website
Taiyo Europe GmbH website
Taiwan Taiyo Kogyo Inc. website
MakMax Australia, Taiyo Membrane Corporation Pty Ltd website

Engineering companies based in Tokyo
Manufacturing companies based in Tokyo
Japanese companies established in 1922
Technology companies established in 1922
Japanese brands